Old Edwardians, sometimes abbreviated to OE, refers to old boys/girls of schools with Edward in the name of the school. It is also used to refer to Old Etonians.

Schools called King Edward's School or similar names include:
King Edward VI Aston
King Edward's School, Birmingham
King Edward VI Five Ways
King Edward VI Handsworth
King Edward's School, Bath
King Edward VI School, Southampton
King Edward VII School, Sheffield
King Edward VII School (Johannesburg)
St Edward's College, Liverpool
St. Edward's Secondary School in Sierra Leone.

It may also refer to:
Old Edwardians F.C., a football club in Sierra Leone.

See also
 List of Old Edwardians (Sheffield)